The Friulian Dolomites, also known as Dolomiti d'Oltre Piave ("Dolomites beyond the Piave") are a mountain range in the Carnic and Gailtal Alps. They are located in northeastern Veneto and Friuli-Venezia Giulia, in northeastern Italy. They are the easternmost dolomitic group. As part of the Dolomites, they have been officially recognized as UNESCO World Heritage Site under the World Heritage Convention, and most of their area is also covered by the Friulian Dolomites Natural Park.

The range is located across the provinces of Belluno, Udine and Pordenone, between the upper Piave valley to the west, the Meduna valley to the east, the Cellina valley to the south, and the upper Tagliamento valley to the north. It is divided into four sub-groups, Cridola, Spalti-Monfalconi, Duranno and Pramaggiore.

Peaks
Notable peaks of the Friulian Dolomites are:

See also
 Eastern Alps
 Dolomites
 Limestone Alps

References

Carnic Alps
Mountain ranges of the Alps
Mountain ranges of Italy
World Heritage Sites in Italy
Mountains of Friuli-Venezia Giulia
Dolomites